Jan Frederik Glastra van Loon (16 March 1920 – 22 October 2001) was a Dutch politician of the Democrats 66 (D66) party.

Decorations

References

External links

Official
  Mr.Dr. J.F. (Jan) Glastra van Loon Parlement & Politiek
  Mr.Dr. J.F. Glastra van Loon (D66) Eerste Kamer der Staten-Generaal

 

 

 
 

1920 births
2001 deaths
Commanders of the Order of Orange-Nassau
Chairmen of the Democrats 66
Democrats 66 politicians
Knights of the Order of the Netherlands Lion
Dutch academic administrators
Dutch humanists
Dutch nonprofit directors
Dutch nonprofit executives
20th-century Dutch judges
Dutch legal scholars
Dutch resistance members
Dutch people of Indonesian descent
Dutch people of World War II
Dutch political philosophers
Dutch political writers
Leiden University alumni
Academic staff of Leiden University
Indo people
Jurisprudence academics
Members of the Senate (Netherlands)
People from Batavia, Dutch East Indies
Politicians from The Hague
Philosophers of law
State Secretaries for Justice of the Netherlands
Academic staff of the University of Amsterdam
Writers from The Hague
20th-century Dutch educators
20th-century Dutch male writers
20th-century Dutch politicians